A half viaduct is a type of viaduct built into a hillside, where only part of the road is supported by the structure.

Road infrastructure